was a Japanese video game company that released numerous games for video game consoles, home computers and mobile phones, mainly from the 1980s to the 2000s. It was headquartered in the Midtown Tower in Tokyo, with an additional office in the Hudson Building in Sapporo.

Hudson Soft was founded on May 18, 1973. Initially, it dealt with personal computer products, but later expanded to the development and publishing of video games, mobile content, video game peripherals and music recording. Primarily a video game publisher, it internally developed many of the video games it released while outsourcing others to external companies. It is known for series such as Bomberman, Adventure Island, Star Soldier, and Bonk. Hudson also developed video games released by other publishers such as the Mario Party series from Nintendo. The mascot of the company is a bee named Hachisuke.

Hudson Soft made the TurboGrafx-16 in association with NEC, to compete against Nintendo, Sega, and SNK, while continuing making games on other platforms, as a third-party developer.

Hudson Soft ceased to exist as a company on March 1, 2012, and merged with Konami Digital Entertainment, which was the surviving entity. Konami owns the assets of Hudson and has since rereleased its video game back catalogue on different occasions.

History
Hudson Soft Ltd. was founded in Toyohira-ku, Sapporo, Japan on May 18, 1973 by brothers Yuji and Hiroshi Kudo. The founders grew up admiring trains, and named the business after their favourite, the Hudson locomotives (called the "4-6-4", and especially Japanese C62).

Hudson began as an amateur radio shop called CQ Hudson (CQハドソン), selling radio telecommunications devices and art photographs. Yuji Kudo had originally planned to start a coffee shop, but there was already one in the same building, resulting in the decision to change to a wireless radio shop at the eleventh hour. Although the Kudo brothers had university education, neither had studied in business management. That factor, combined with the difficulty to find trustworthy people to accompany the Kudos in their venture, meant that Hudson was almost always in the red each month during its era exclusively as a radio shop.

In September 1975, Hudson began selling personal computer-related products and in March 1978 started developing and selling video game packages. At that time, many amateur radio shops were switching to the sales of personal computers because they deal with the same electronic equipment. CQ Hudson would continue to operate for decades in Sapporo until Hudson Soft closed the shop in May 2001.

In the late 1970s and early 1980s, Hudson Soft favoured a quantity-over-quality approach for the marketing of video games. At one point, the company released up to 30 different computer software titles per month; none of which were hugely successful. Things changed in late 1983, when Hudson started to prioritise quality-over-quantity. Hudson became Nintendo's first third-party software vendor for the Family Computer and its title for this console, Lode Runner, sold 1.2 million units after its 1984 release.

The business continued developing video games on the Famicom and computer platforms (MSX, NEC PC-8801 and ZX Spectrum, among others).  Bomberman was released in December of this year on the Famicom and was considered a "big hit" by Hudson Soft.

In July 1987, Hudson developed the "C62 System" and collaborated with NEC to develop the PC Engine video game console. It achieved a second-best success to Famicom in Japan, but its release as the TurboGrafx-16 in North America had less market share than Nintendo's new Super NES, Sega's new Genesis, or SNK's Neo Geo AES. In 1990, Hudson Soft developed and published video games for an array of systems. In 1994, the 32-bit semiconductor chip "HuC62" was independently developed by Hudson and used in NEC's PC-FX video game console.

In 2004, Hudson started a joint venture with Flying Tiger Entertainment for 25 titles.
 
Hudson Soft relocated its main office to Tokyo in 2005, although the Sapporo headquarters remained in operation as a secondary office.

Hudson Soft lost several key people starting in the mid-2000s. Co-founder Hiroshi Kudo left the company in November 2004 following financial losses. Shinichi Nakamoto, who was with the company since 1978 and creator of the Bomberman series, followed suit in 2006. Veteran Takahashi Meijin resigned in May 2011; he had joined Hudson Soft in 1982. Around 2010–2011, many employees migrated to Nintendo's restructured NDCube studio which is headed by Hidetoshi Endo, himself a former Hudson Soft President.

Relation with Konami
The relation between Hudson Soft and Konami can be traced to at least as early as 1985, when Hudson ported Konami's arcade game Pooyan to the MSX and Famicom. But the acquisition process of Hudson Soft by Konami would only begin in 2001.

Hudson Soft was severely hit by the collapse of its main bank Hokkaido Takushoku. Seeking new financing alternatives, Hudson Soft entered the stock market for the first time in December 2000, listing on the NASDAQ Japan Exchange. This led to Konami purchasing a stock allocation of 5.6 million shares in August 2001, becoming the company's largest shareholder. Within the terms of this purchase, Hudson acquired the Sapporo division of Konami Computer Entertainment Studio, renaming it Hudson Studio.

In April 2005, capital was increased via an allocation of 3 million shares from a third party. Konami Corporation, holding 53.99% of all Hudson stock, became Hudson's majority shareholder and parent company. Hudson Soft continued to publish video games while working closely with Konami, who became Hudson's distributor in Japan.

In April 2011, Hudson Soft became a wholly owned subsidiary of Konami. Its American division, Hudson Entertainment, was liquidated in the process.
 
On March 1, 2012, Hudson Soft officially ceased to exist following a merger with Konami Digital Entertainment, with its music business being absorbed into KME Corporation. The move was not a unilateral decision from Konami, but rather a voluntary merger agreed by the two companies during a board meeting held on January 12, 2012. The main reason for the dissolution of Hudson Soft was the consolidation of the operations of Hudson and Konami into a single company.

Despite the demise of Hudson Soft, Konami had planned for products to continue being developed and offered under the Hudson brand. The Hudson website was even initially retained and maintained by Konami. By early 2014 however, Konami had retired the website. The pre-2005 headquarters of Hudson Soft in Sapporo continued to operate as a branch of Konami well after the absorption until it closed in October 2014. In 2015, Konami sold the Sapporo building that had long been the headquarters of Hudson Soft.

Caravan competitions
On a yearly basis from 1985 to 2000, and sporadically since, Hudson Soft has held a games competition across Japan known as the "Hudson All-Japan Caravan Festival". Most years the competition focused around a single game, with all of the initial years of 1985 to 1992 except 1988 being shoot em ups. During these years, the Caravan can be seen as a hallmark of Hudson's popularity. Later Caravans were less popular and featured less punishing games. Several of these later Caravans focused on Hudson Softs popular Bomberman series.

Many of the early shoot 'em up games used for the Caravan competition included two-minute and five-minute modes built into the cartridges, to allow potential competitors to practice prior to the competitions.

1985 - Star Force for the Famicom became the first game featured for the summer competitions held within Japan.
1986 - Star Soldier for the Famicom became the second competition game.
1987 - Starship Hector (In Japan, simply Hector '87) was the third and last Famicom game featured as the Hudson Caravan moved onto the newer PC Engine. The first three were reproduced in Hudson Caravan Collection for the Super Famicom and Hudson Best Collection for the Game Boy Advance
1988 - Power League (World Class Baseball in the USA) became the first PC Engine competition game, unusual for the competition being a sports game rather than a shooter.
1989 - Gunhed (Blazing Lazers) for the PC Engine was the competition game. A small number of cartridges were produced for the competition under the name Gunhed Taikai (Special Edition) and are very rare and expensive for the most hardcore of collectors to find.
1990 - Super Star Soldier for the PC Engine
1991 - Final Soldier for the PC Engine
1992 - Soldier Blade for the PC Engine would be the last of the popular caravan competitions as later events were held using the more casual Bomberman and other games fittingly popular at the time. The PC Engine games from '90, '91, and '92 were re-released as the PC Engine Best Collection - Soldier Collection for the PSP.

Subsidiaries

Hudson Studio
A division located in Sapporo. Originally formed as a division of Konami Computer Entertainment Studio, it was acquired by Hudson on July 26, 2001.

Hudson Soft USA
Hudson Soft's first North American publishing division, formed in 1988 and originally headquartered in South San Francisco. It had published video games for the Nintendo Entertainment System, Super NES and Game Boy.

In late 1995, Hudson Soft USA sold off the rights for all of its yet-to-be-released games to Acclaim Entertainment and moved its headquarters to Seattle, Washington, before closing down by the end of the year.

Hudson Entertainment, Inc.
Hudson Soft's second North American publishing division, reestablished by John Brandstetter of Flying Tiger and formed in November 2003 as the successor to Hudson Soft USA and headquartered in Brea California at Flying Tiger's Headquarters. Then it was moved to San Mateo, California. Starting out as a video game publisher for mobile content, it expanded into console video games in 2007.

On July 23, 2003, Hudson Soft announced the start of its North American mobile phone Java game service, GameMaster, which was created by Flying Tiger for AT&T's mMode, and NTT DoCoMo effective on July 28, 2003.

Hudson Entertainment ceased operations on March 31, 2011, after Konami's acquisition of the parent company.

Hudson Music Entertainment
Hudson Soft's music recording label unit. Absorbed on March 1, 2012 into KME Corporation, the music subsidiary of Konami Digital Entertainment.

Video game releases

Hudson Soft is responsible for series such as Bomberman, Bonk, Star Soldier, and Adventure Island.

Hudson also released a long-running and popular video game series in Japan. Far East of Eden was a classic RPG set in a fictionalized feudal Japan. The series was up to its fourth main entry when Hudson was absorbed into Konami. The second entry in the series was widely regarded as one of the best RPGs ever released, ranked 12th by Famitsu among all games released in Japan. Hudson Soft also created the long-running and critically acclaimed Momotaro Dentetsu series, a board game-style video game centered around business transactions.  16 games in the series released in Japan. Before its absorption, Hudson had re-released some of its first hit games for the GameCube in Japan, including Adventure Island, Star Soldier, and Lode Runner.

Hudson had a long history of creating games for other companies. The most notable of these were the Mario Party games, which they developed for Nintendo. They developed the first eight console installments and two handheld spin-offs; however, due to Hudson being acquired by Konami, Mario Party 9 and all games after that have been developed by Nintendo subsidiary NDcube, which consists of many former Hudson employees. Hudson also developed Fuzion Frenzy 2 for Microsoft, which was released for the Xbox 360 in January 2007. Bomberman 64: The Second Attack was published by Vatical Entertainment, unlike the former two games on the Nintendo 64 which were both published by Nintendo.

Notes

References

External links

Official website

Konami
Video game companies established in 1973
Video game companies disestablished in 2012
2012 mergers and acquisitions
Japanese companies established in 1973
Japanese companies disestablished in 2012
Defunct video game companies of Japan
Video game publishers
Video game development companies